The 2000 Super 12 season was the fifth season of the Super 12, contested by teams from Australia, New Zealand and South Africa. The season ran from February to May 2000, with each team playing all the others once. At the end of the regular season, the top four teams entered the playoff semi finals, with the first placed team playing the fourth and the second placed team playing the third. The winner of each semi final qualified for the final, which was contested by the Crusaders and the Brumbies at Bruce Stadium, Canberra. The Crusaders won 20 – 19 to win their third consecutive Super 12 title.

Table

Results

Round 1

Round 2

Round 3

Round 4

Round 5

Round 6

Round 7

Round 8

Round 9

Round 10

Round 11

Round 12

Finals

Semi finals

Grand final

Individual records

Top point scorers

Top try scorers

References

1
1
Super Rugby seasons
1
Super 12